Stalkya is a monotypic genus of flowering plants from the orchid family, Orchidaceae. The sole species is Stalkya muscicola, endemic to the Mérida region of Venezuela. It is named after the orchidologist G. C. K. "Stalky" Dunsterville.

See also
 List of Orchidaceae genera

References

External links

Monotypic Orchidoideae genera
Cranichideae genera
Spiranthinae
Orchids of Venezuela